Mong Maoe (Wa: weng Mēng Hmae; Shan (Dai Yai): ဝဵင်းမိူင်းမႂ်ႇ weng Moeng Hmaue (town of new territory);) is the capital town of Mongmao Township of Shan State.

Rubber finishing factories were constructed in Mongmao and in Pangsang and Namtit as well.

References

Populated places in Shan State
Township capitals of Myanmar